The Province of Halle-Merseburg was a province of the Free State of Prussia from 1944 to 1945. The provincial capital was the city Merseburg.

Halle-Merseburg was created on 1 July 1944, out of Regierungsbezirk Merseburg, an administrative region from the former Province of Saxony. The governor of the new province was Joachim Albrecht Eggeling, the Gauleiter of the Nazi Gau Halle-Merseburg. In 1945, the Province of Halle-Merseburg was dissolved into a recreated Province of Saxony.

Districts in 1945

Urban districts
 Eisleben
 Halle
 Merseburg
 Naumburg
 Weißenfels
 Lutherstadt Wittenberg
 Zeitz

Rural districts
Bitterfeld
Delitzsch
Eckartsberga (seat: Kölleda)
Liebenwerda (seat: Bad Liebenwerda)
Mansfelder Gebirgskreis (seat: Mansfeld)
Mansfelder Seekreis (seat: Eisleben)
Merseburg
Querfurt
Saalkreis (seat: Halle)
Sangerhausen
Schweinitz (seat: Herzberg)
Torgau
Weißenfels
Wittenberg
Zeitz

1944 establishments in Germany
States and territories established in 1944
1945 disestablishments in Germany
States and territories disestablished in 1945
Provinces of Prussia
Former states and territories of Saxony-Anhalt
Halle (Saale)
Merseburg